Carol Bartha (19 September 1923 – 7 December 1976) was a Romanian footballer who played as a forward for teams such as Ciocanul București, Dinamo "B" București (also known as Unirea Tricolor București), Dinamo București or Progresul Oradea.

International career
Carol Bartha played at international level in 7 matches for Romania.

Honours
Dinamo București
Divizia A: 1955
Cupa României: Runner-up 1954

References

External links
 
 
 

1923 births
1976 deaths
Sportspeople from Oradea
Romanian footballers
Romania international footballers
Association football forwards
Liga I players
Maccabi București players
FC Dinamo București players
CA Oradea players
Romanian football managers
CA Oradea managers